The Paul Stock House was the residence of three-time Cody, Wyoming mayor, oilman, rancher and philanthropist Paul Stock. Built in 1945–46, the house is on a secluded site on a bluff overlooking the Shoshone River, with a view of Heart and Cedar Mountains on the edge of Cody. The house was designed by Leon Goodrich, who was fired after two months because Stock didn't want to be told what to do by the architect.  Stock took over the management of the project from then on, building the rambling house in the Spanish Eclectic style. While Stock oversaw the project himself, he kept nearly all of Goodrich's design intact.

The exterior is finished in stucco over hollow clay tile with tile roof accents.

Stock employed oilfield technology in his house, using deep pilings for support and employing oilfield piping for water, sewer and gas pipes. Two fireplaces are built of polished well cores from the nearby Oregon Basin. Two guest houses in similar style are nearby on the site.

The Stock House is owned by the Buffalo Bill Historical Center and is used as a guest residence. It was listed on the National Register of Historic Places in 2000.

See also
Stock Center, the original Buffalo Bill Museum in Cody, purchased by Stock and given to Cody as  community center, also listed on the National Register of Historic Places

References

External links
 at the National Park Service's NRHP database
Paul Stock House at the Wyoming State Historic Preservation Office

Houses in Park County, Wyoming
Houses on the National Register of Historic Places in Wyoming
Cody, Wyoming
National Register of Historic Places in Park County, Wyoming
1945 establishments in Wyoming
Houses completed in 1945